The 2019 UMass Dartmouth Corsairs football team represented the University of Massachusetts Dartmouth as a member of the Massachusetts State Collegiate Athletic Conference (MASCAC) during the 2019 NCAA Division III football season. The Corsairs, led by 13th-year head coach Mark Robichaud, played their home games at Cressy Field in Dartmouth, Massachusetts.

Previous season

The Corsairs finished the 2018 season with a record of 5–5 (4–4 in the MASCAC). They finished in a two-way tie for second place. UMass Dartmouth started the season unranked and did not receive any rankings throughout the season.

The team finished the 2018 season unranked.

Schedule

Game summaries

Alfred State

Husson

Fitchburg State

Plymouth State

at Framingham State

at Bridgewater State

Worcester State

at Western Connecticut

Massachusetts Maritime

at Westfield State

Personnel

Coaching staff

Roster

Statistics

Team

Individual leaders

Offense

Special teams

References

UMass Dartmouth
UMass Dartmouth Corsairs football seasons
UMass Dartmouth Corsairs football